Helen De Cruz (born 1978) is a Belgian philosopher and Danforth Chair of Philosophy at Saint Louis University who specialises in philosophy of religion, experimental philosophy, and philosophy of cognitive science.  She is also an activist supporting the rights of EU citizens in the context of Brexit.

Biography 

De Cruz received her BA in archaeology and art studies and an MA in anthropology of art from Ghent University.  In 2007 she completed a PhD in archaeology and art studies at Vrije Universiteit Brussel, and in 2011 she completed a PhD in philosophy at Groningen University, entitled Through a Mind Darkly: An Empirically-informed philosophical perspective on systematic knowledge acquisition and cognitive limitations, under the supervision of Igor Douven. After post-doctoral research positions at University of Leuven and Somerville College, Oxford, she joined VU Amsterdam as an assistant professor of philosophy in 2015, before moving to Oxford Brookes University in 2016.  She has held the Danforth Chair of Philosophy at Saint Louis University since September 2019.

She is currently an Executive Editor of the Journal of Analytic Theology, and a member of the editorial boards of the Stanford Encyclopedia of Philosophy, the Journal of Mind & Behavior, and Religious Studies.

In 2014 De Cruz published a series of interviews with philosophers working outside of academia for the NewAPPS blog.  She was a signatory on a 2018 open letter from academic philosophers to Amber Rudd, which urged the then home secretary to reconsider a request for asylum.  The letter described a request which had been denied on the grounds that the applicant had not mentioned Plato or Aristotle when asked about humanism. The letter's signatories argued that the applicant should not have been expected to mention them.

In addition to being a prolific philosopher, De Cruz is also a player of the Renaissance lute and a digital artist.

Books 

 (in press). Religious disagreement. Cambridge: Cambridge University Press.
 De Cruz, H., & De Smedt, J. (2015). A natural history of natural theology. The cognitive science of theology and philosophy of religion. MIT Press.

References

External links 

 Home page

1978 births
Living people
Fellows of Somerville College, Oxford